Delwood Coaches was an Australian bus company operating services in Granville, Western Sydney.

History
Delwood Coaches was founded as Delwood Bus Company in 1958 by Jim Newport and Carl Tattam. Newport later bought Tattam's share. In June 1958, the company purchased two routes from Trailer Tours, which was the tour and charter company of Parramatta-Ryde Bus Service.

Jim Newport, in partnership with Roger Graham and Dick Rowe, also operated Campbelltown Transit. By 1970, Rowe had taken full ownership of Campbelltown Transit.

Delwood Bus Company acquired a number of bus companies in the 1970s. The first were Granville Bus Company and Lidcombe Bus Company from Webb Bros in 1970/71. Route 59 of Lidcombe Bus Company was eventually sold to Drummond Transit in July 1974. The next was Parramatta-Villawood Bus Service from Fred Bowman and Dick Rowe in January 1978. This excluded route 97 which was discontinued. These companies later operated as Delwood Coaches.

In February 1980, Bankstown-Parramatta Bus Lines, a joint venture between Delwood Bus Company and Chester Hill-Bankstown Bus Service, commenced operation of Red Arrow route 320. The Chester Hill-Bankstown share was passed to Auburn Bus Service in 1986.

In July 1987, Delwood Coaches renumbered their routes to the Sydney Region Route Number System:
902: Parramatta station to Villawood via Granville
903: Parramatta station to South Granville via Granville
904: Granville station to South Granville
905: Granville station to South Granville 
910: Parramatta station to Bankstown station via Granville (jointly operated with Auburn Bus Service)

In May 1990, Delwood Coaches commenced an unnumbered service between Parramatta to Sydney Airport via Bankstown. In July 1990, Auburn Bus Service sold its share of 910 to Delwood, leaving Delwood Coaches as the sole operator of the route.

In April 1992, Delwood Coaches sold out to Baxter's Bus Lines, with 32 buses and the Villawood depot. The Parramatta to Sydney Airport service was discontinued by Baxter's. The Villawood depot continued to be used by Baxter's until 2005, then Connex NSW (later Veolia) until 2012 when the new Veolia depot in Granville was completed.

Fleet
Delwood Coaches operated a fleet of 32 buses as of April 1992, all of which were sold to Baxter's Bus Lines. It had a white and dark blue livery.

References

Bus companies of New South Wales
Bus transport in Sydney
Defunct bus companies of Australia
Transport companies established in 1958
Transport companies disestablished in 1992
1958 establishments in Australia
1992 disestablishments in Australia